Roscoe Tanner defeated Guillermo Vilas in the final, 6–3, 6–3, 6–3 to win the men's singles tennis title at the January 1977 Australian Open.

Mark Edmondson was the defending champion, but lost in the quarterfinals to Ken Rosewall. This was the first Australian Open men's singles final since 1912 not to feature an Australian player.

Seeds
The seeded players are listed below. Roscoe Tanner is the champion; others show the round in which they were eliminated.

   Guillermo Vilas (final)
   Roscoe Tanner (champion)
   Arthur Ashe (quarterfinals)
   Ken Rosewall (semifinals)

Qualifying

Draw

Key
 Q = Qualifier
 WC = Wild card
 LL = Lucky loser
 r = Retired

Final eight

Section 1

Section 2

Section 3

Section 4

External links
 Australian Open (1977) on ATPWorldTour.com
 1977 Australian Open (January) – Men's draws and results at the International Tennis Federation

Mens singles
Australian Open (tennis) by year – Men's singles